War Highways were designated in the U.S. state of Texas by the Texas State Highway Commission in 1942 and 1943 to serve military camps and military bases. All have been cancelled or redesignated.

War Highway 1
War Highway 1 was designated on October 31, 1942, from US 190 northward  to the main entrance of Camp Hood (now Fort Hood). This was cancelled six months after the war. At , War Highway 1 was the shortest state highway in Texas at the time. On March 20, 1946, War Highway 1 was redesignated Spur 172.

War Highway 2
War Highway 2 was designated on October 31, 1942, from US 87 east  to the main entrance of Camp Bullis. This was cancelled six months after the war.

War Highway 3
War Highway 3 was designated on October 31, 1942, from SH 6 northward  to the main entrance of Camp Wallace. This was cancelled six months after the war, was later part of FM 1765, and is now part of FM 2004.

War Highway 4
This was cancelled six months after the war.

War Highway 5
On November 2, 1959, this was redesignated as Spur 309.

War Highway 6
This was cancelled six months after the war.

War Highway 7
This was cancelled six months after the war, and was redesignated as FM 707 on December 10, 1946.

War Highway 8
This was cancelled six months after the war, and is now FM 2417.

War Highway 9
This was redesignated as FM 683 on April 9, 1946, part of which is now FM 245.

War Highway 10
War Highway 10 was designated on October 31, 1942, from SH 35 at the Jackson–Matagorda county line southward  to Well Point. War Highway 10 served as access to Camp Hulen. This was cancelled six months after the war, and is now FM 3280.

War Highway 11
War Highway 11 was designated on November 24, 1942, from US 54 to the New Mexico state line. War Highway 11 served as access to Fort Bliss. This was cancelled six months after the war, and is now FM 3255.

War Highway 12
War Highway 12 was designated on November 24, 1942, from US 75 west  to Camp Perrin. This was redesignated as FM 691 on April 16, 1946.

War Highway 13
War Highway 13 was designated on December 21, 1942, from SH 107 at Cantu, west and north  to Moore Field. This was redesignated as FM 681 on April 16, 1946.

War Highway 14
War Highway 14 was designated on December 21, 1942, from US 80 west of Big Spring south  to the north boundary of the Air Force Training School area. This was redesignated as FM 700 on November 8, 1946.

War Highway 15
War Highway 15 was designated on February 11, 1943, from the east entrance of Camp Hood east via Rancier Avenue to 8th Street (later FM 439). This was cancelled six months after the war, and is now part of FM 439.

War Highway 16
War Highway 16 was designated on March 8, 1943, from US 83 south of Childress west  to the Air Force Bombardier School. On March 18, 1947, War Highway 16 was redesignated as Spur 184, which became part of FM 164 on October 9, 1973.

War Highway 17
War Highway 17 was designated on April 15, 1943, from US 271 near Clink Scales to SH 31 near Walton's Store. On September 9, 1947, War Highway 17 was redesignated as FM 757.

War Highway 18
War Highway 18 was designated on June 10, 1943, from US 70/US 287 in Wichita Falls  to US 277 (now SH 240) in Sheppard Field. This was cancelled six months after the war, and is now Spur 325.

War Highway 19
This was cancelled on June 11, 1945, and was redesignated as FM 409, which was replaced by FM 105 on January 29, 1953, when FM 105 was extended (FM 105 and FM 409 were not end to end before this, the realignment of FM 105 to be straight was later).

War Highway 20
War Highway 20 was designated on August 3, 1943, from SH 34 south of Greenville east to Majors Basic Field. This was cancelled six months after the war, and is now FM 1570.

War Highway 21
War Highway 21 was designated on November 16, 1943, from US 80 (now I-20) at Tye southward via the Camp Barkeley Air Support Command Base to SH 158 (now US 277) at Caps. This was cancelled six months after the war, and was redesignated as FM 708 (now part of FM 707) on December 10, 1946.

See also

References

1940s establishments in Texas
1940s disestablishments in Texas
Roads in Texas